Paharpur is a town of Dera Ismail Khan District in Khyber Pakhtunkhwa, Pakistan. The town is the headquarters of Paharpur Tehsil, an administrative subdivision of the district, and is a Union Council. It is located at 32°6'8N 70°58'12E and has an altitude of 173 metres (570 feet).

Notables 
Lt.Col Aurangzeb Khan Marwat

References

Union councils of Dera Ismail Khan District
Populated places in Dera Ismail Khan District